Walter Copan is an American chemist and government official who served as the under secretary of commerce for standards and technology from 2017 to 2021. Prior to assuming that role, he worked as president and CEO of IP Engineering Group Corporation and as a board member of Rocky Mountain Innovation Partners.

Early life and education
Copan received a Bachelor of Arts degree in chemistry from Western Reserve College in 1975 and a his Ph.D. in physical chemistry from Case Western Reserve University in 1982.

Career
Copan previously served as managing director of technology commercialization and partnerships at Brookhaven National Laboratory and as technology transfer at the National Renewable Energy Laboratory. During his time at Brookhaven, he led a pilot program across the United States Department of Energy called Agreements for Commercializing Technology. The program was praised for making intellectual property agreements between businesses and government more flexible and for promoting an entrepreneurial culture. He led Clean Diesel Technologies onto NASDAQ while serving as CTO and executive vice president. Copan also had a 28-year career with Lubrizol, where he was active in research, development, and business unit management. At Lubrizol, Copan led the company's European research and development during the late 1980s and early 1990s, including working with countries that had recently broken away from the Soviet Union.

Under secretary of commerce for standards and technology 
In September 2017, Copan was nominated by President Donald Trump to become under secretary of commerce for standards and technology. Copan's nomination was supported by the University Corporation for Atmospheric Research. He was confirmed unanimously by the United States Senate in October 2017.

At that time, Copan said his top priority in the role would be to implement the Cybersecurity Framework, a National Institute of Standards and Technology effort to improve network security across federal agencies and industry.

Post-government career 
As a political appointee, he left office on January 20, 2021.  In July 2021, Copan joined Colorado School of Mines as the Vice President of Research and Technology Transfer. In 2022, Copan contributed to a letter to the United States Department of Justice signed by former federal officials of both parties that criticized the Biden administration's proposed policy changes for standard-essential patents.

References

Living people
Under Secretaries of Commerce for Standards and Technology
Case Western Reserve University alumni
20th-century American chemists
21st-century American chemists
Trump administration personnel
Year of birth missing (living people)